Unadilla Waterworks is a historic waterworks and national historic district located at Unadilla in Otsego County, New York.  It encompasses one contributing building and 11 contributing structures.  It consists of two separate sites that were developed between 1880 and 1891 to supply the village with water for fire protection and domestic use.

It was listed on the National Register of Historic Places in 1992.

References

Water supply infrastructure of New York (state)
Historic districts in Otsego County, New York
Historic districts on the National Register of Historic Places in New York (state)
National Register of Historic Places in Otsego County, New York
Water supply infrastructure on the National Register of Historic Places